Benjamin Tucker (1854–1939) was an American anarchist.

Benjamin Tucker may also refer to:
Benjamin B. Tucker (born 1951), American police officer
Benjamin Tucker (civil servant) (1762–1829), English civil servant

See also
Ben Tucker (1930–2013), American bassist